Pyinmana Township is one of eight townships of Naypyidaw Union Territory, Myanmar.

History
Historically, Pyinmana was formerly known as Ningyan (နင်းကြမ်း). Shan traders who observed the abundance of Terminalia chebula trees around the area named the city Pangmaakna (ပၢင်မၢၵ်ႇၼႃႉ), lit. "myrobalan encampment," from which the Burmese language name Pyinmana is derived.

Pyinmana Township was formerly part of Mandalay Division. The township was designated as one of the original townships constituting the new capital region of Naypyidaw on 26 November 2008 by the Ministry of Home Affairs (MOHA).

Demographics

2014

The 2014 Myanmar Census reported that Pyinmana Township had a population of 187,565. The population density was 170.1 people per km². The census reported that the median age was 26.6 years, and 94 males per 100 females. There were 39,663 households; the mean household size was 4.5.

Villages

Dams
Pyinmana Township has the following dams.
Ngalaik Dam
Chaungmagyi Dam
Yezin Dam

Creeks
Pyinmana has

References

Naypyidaw